Epipedobates narinensis is a species of poison dart frog (family Dendrobatidae). It was first described as a distinct species in 2008.

After a major reclassification of poison dart frogs in 2006, Epipedobates had only 5 species remaining in the genus. E. narinensis is one of two species since discovered and described in Epipedobates, the other being Epipedobates darwinwallacei.

Description 
No females were identified in the initial description. Males have a snout-vent length of 15-17mm, with a dark green dorsum and black flanks. A light green to blue-green ventrolateral line extends from the lip to the groin. The abdomen is yellow to yellow-green, mottled and reticulated. E. narinensis is similar to E. boulengeri and E. espinosai. E. narinensis is distinguishable by its forefinger being much longer than its second finger, compared to the forefinger being only slightly longer than the second finger in other species.

Distribution 
Little is known about the distribution of E. narinensis. It was first described in Nariño, Colombia, from which it derives its name.

References 

narinensis
Amphibians described in 2008